Andrew Norman Wilson (born November 1983) is an artist living in America.

Education 

Wilson went to Medfield Senior High School in Medfield, Massachusetts.  He received a BS in Television, Radio, and Film from the Newhouse School of Communications at Syracuse University in 2006.  Wilson then received an MFA in Sculpture from the School of the Art Institute of Chicago in 2011.

Works

Virtual Assistance 

Wilson's video work Virtual Assistance (2009–11) was made while he was an MFA candidate at the School of the Art Institute of Chicago. In this piece Wilson documents his use of a personal assistant outsourcing service located in India called GetFriday.  The work presents Wilson's relationship with Akhil, his 25-year-old personal assistant.  Instead of asking Akhil to complete the tasks he was used to doing for other clients - such as email, finances, and calendar management - Wilson reversed this by asking Akhil to assign him tasks and to come up with ideas for collaborative projects.

Workers Leaving the Googleplex 

Andrew Norman Wilson's Viral Video Piece Workers Leaving the Googleplex piece contains footage of two Google locations in Mountain View, California with a voice-over narrative spoken by Wilson.  The content for this video came out of Wilson's experience of working at Google in 2007. The piece presents the class structure of Google shown through Wilson's encounter with the yellow-badge workers, a top-secret group of workers that scan books for Google Book Search. The artist's attempts to film and interview the yellow-badge workers were stopped quickly by Google security and resulted in the termination of his employment at Google. The video alludes to Workers Leaving the Lumière Factory by Auguste and Louis Lumière and it went viral when it circulated on the Internet in 2011.

ScanOps 

This project is a photographic series made of Google Books images in which errors in the scanning process are visible.
The yellow-badge workers that are the subject of Workers Leaving the Googleplex is the same group of workers responsible for the scanning of books for Google Books images.

Movement Materials and What We Can Do 

Movement Materials and What We Can Do is an extended essay video that presents an overview of Workers Leaving the Googleplex and ScanOps while considering related histories of film and video, photography, and literature.  The material basis of analog and digital media, as well as their labor processes, are also addressed.

SONE 

SONE (formerly known as Stock Fantasy Ventures) consists of proposals to investors to fund the creation of commercial image concepts that were then distributed on both the art market and stock media marketplaces such as Getty Images. The images were meant to supply the global market of advertising, business, art, and journalism with imagery that represents widespread feelings of financial uncertainty and discontent. Public Investor Meetings were held at various locations, and the project had its solo gallery debut at Project Native Informant in London in June 2014. The project was brought to an end through a liquidation event at the Museum of Modern Art Warsaw in 2016.

Uncertainty Seminars

"Uncertainty Seminars" is both a single channel video and a multi-channel video installation. Framed as a 5 part psychiatric care video series spread across 5 clinical viewing units, each unit positions the viewer's body in particular ways according to each video section's demands. The architecture and objects were made in collaboration with artist Nick Bastis.

Image Employment 

Image Employment  is a curatorial project produced with collaborator Aily Nash that debuted at MoMA PS1 in September 2013. It presents recent moving image works that investigate various modes of contemporary production. The selected works illustrate differing approaches to the subject, from observational films that avoid participation in capitalistic image creation, to videos that engage corporate omnipotence by employing its processes, as well as works that complicate these two tendencies.

Artists included in the exhibition:  Michael Bell-Smith, Neil Beloufa, Guy Ben-Ner, Ben Thorp Brown, DIS, Harm van den Dorpel, Dan Eisenberg, Kevin Jerome Everson, Harun Farocki, Zachary Formwalt, Mark Leckey, Sharon Lockhart, Auguste and Louis Lumière, Lucy Raven, Ben Rivers, Hito Steyerl, Superflex, Pilvi Takala, Ryan Trecartin, Andrew Norman Wilson

Reality Models 

Reality Models is an extended remake of a scene from Peppermint Park, an obscure educational home video series produced in the 1980s by a group of investors seeking to profit off the narrative models that Sesame Street invented for educational children's entertainment.

The Unthinkable Bygone 

Through the use of Baby Sinclair, a puppet character from Jim Henson’s 1990s animatronic dinosaur sitcom Dinosaurs, The Unthinkable Bygone conflates scientific visualization (3D modeling, simulation, endoscopy, dissection, reflection) and cinematic technique to reconstruct science as a cultural practice.

Ode to Seekers 2012 

Ode to Seekers 2012 Ode to Seekers 2012 is an infinite loop video that celebrates the existence and activity of three differently scaled entities - a mosquito, an oil pumpjack, and a syringe - as they seek out an ambiguous resource by piercing a surface that looks like desert salt flats, or skin under a microscope, or potato casserole. Its formal composition is based on a translation of the poetic techniques used in John Keats' Ode on a Grecian Urn.

Kodak 

A semi-biographical fiction inspired by his father's work at one of Kodak's first processing labs, Wilson's speculative gloss on the evolution of photochemical science entwines multiple perspectives and personas. Co-written by James N. Kienitz Wilkins, Kodak imagines a dialogue between a blind, mentally unstable former film technician and George Eastman himself, recordings of whom play out over a procession of photographs, home video footage, vintage Kodak ads, and animations.

Exhibitions 

Andrew Norman Wilson's exhibitions include Dreamlands at the Whitney Museum of American Art (2016), the Gwangju Biennale (2016), the Berlin Biennale (2016), the Bucharest Biennale (2016), and On Sweat, Paper and Porcelain at Center for Curatorial Studies at Bard College in Annandale-on-Hudson, New York (2015), Office Space at Yerba Buena Center for the Arts in San Francisco (2015), Art Post Internet at Ullens Center for Contemporary Art in Beijing (2014), Scars of Our Revolution at Yvon Lambert in Paris (2014), and Image Employment at MoMA PS1 in Queens, New York (2013). Solo exhibitions include Fluxia in Milan, Project Native Informant in London, Document in Chicago, threewalls in Chicago, Reed College in Portland, Oregon. His work has screened in Rencontres internationales du documentaire de Montréal, the New York Film Festival, Prospectif Cinema at the Centre Pompidou, #VOICEOVER at the Palais de Tokyo, the San Francisco International Film Festival, and the Images Festival. He has lectured at Oxford University, Harvard University, Universität der Künste Berlin, and CalArts. His work has been featured in Aperture, Art in America, Artforum, BuzzFeed, Camera Austria International, e-flux publications, Frieze, Gizmodo/Gawker, The New Yorker, and Wired.

External links 

Nick Pinkerton, Andrew Norman Wilson: His Master’s Voice, in: Camera Austria International 145 | 2019

References 

1983 births
Living people
Artists from New York City